This is a list of individual awards won by the players and coaches of the Brisbane Lions' AFL team, the merger of the Fitzroy Lions and the Brisbane Bears, and its AFL Women's and reserves teams (QAFL/NEAFL/VFL).

AFL awards and records

External awards

Brownlow Medal
 Jason Akermanis (2001)
 Simon Black (2002)
 Lachie Neale (2020)

Brownlow Medal runner-up
 Simon Black (2007, 2008)
 Lachie Neale (2022)

Norm Smith Medal
 Shaun Hart (2001)
 Simon Black (2003)

Coleman Medal
 Jonathan Brown (2007)

Indigenous Team of the Century (2005)
 Chris Johnson
 Darryl White
 Michael McLean

All-Australian team
 Jason Akermanis (1999, 2001, 2002, 2004)
 Justin Leppitsch (1999, 2002, 2003)
 Michael Voss (1999, 2001, 2002 – captain, 2003 – captain)
 Simon Black (2001, 2002, 2004)
 Nigel Lappin (2001, 2002, 2003, 2004)
 Leigh Matthews (2001, 2002, 2003) – coach
 Chris Johnson (2002, 2004)
 Luke Power (2004)
 Jonathan Brown (2007 – vice-captain, 2009)
 Tom Rockliff (2014)
 Dayne Zorko (2017)
 Harris Andrews (2019, 2020)
 Charlie Cameron (2019)
 Lachie Neale (2019, 2020, 2022))
 Daniel Rich (2021)

Members of extended squads but not final teams
 Jed Adcock (2007)
 Nigel Lappin (2007)
 Simon Black (2008)
 Daniel Bradshaw (2008)
 Jonathan Brown (2008)
 Mitch Clark (2009)
 Harris Andrews (2018)
 Dayne Beams (2018)
 Hugh McCluggage (2019, 2020, 2021, 2022)
 Dayne Zorko (2019, 2021)
 Charlie Cameron (2021, 2022)
 Jarryd Lyons (2021)

AFL Rising Star
 Daniel Rich (2009)
 Lewis Taylor (2014)

Nominations

Bold players denote winners of the Rising Star. No Brisbane Lions players were nominated in 2011, 2016 or 2022.

AFL Players Association awards

Leigh Matthews Trophy

 Michael Voss (2002, 2003)
 Lachie Neale (2020)

Best First Year Player Award

 Daniel Rich (2009)

Best Captain Award

 Michael Voss (2001, 2002, 2003, 2004)
 Jonathan Brown (2007, 2009)

Robert Rose Award for Most Courageous Player

 Michael Voss (2001)
 Jonathan Brown (2007, 2008, 2011)

Madden Medal

 Luke Power (2012)

22 Under 22 team

 Jack Redden (2012)
 Harris Andrews (2017, 2018, 2019 – captain)
 Eric Hipwood (2017, 2018, 2019)
 Alex Witherden (2018, 2019)
 Hugh McCluggage (2019, 2020)
 Zac Bailey (2021)
 Brandon Starcevich (2021)
 Keidean Coleman (2022)

Members of extended squads but not final teams

 Mitch Golby (2013)
 Jack Redden (2013)
 James Aish (2014)
 Ryan Lester (2014)
 Lewis Taylor (2014, 2015, 2017)
 Justin Clarke (2015)
 Marco Paparone (2015)
 Harris Andrews (2016)
 Hugh McCluggage (2018)
 Jarrod Berry (2019, 2020)
 Zac Bailey (2020)
 Cameron Rayner (2022)

Mark of the Year
 Jonathan Brown (2002)

Goal of the Year
 Jarrod Molloy (1999)
 Jason Akermanis (2002)

Michael Tuck Medal
 Daniel Rich (2013)

International Rules Australian representatives
 Marcus Ashcroft (1999)
 Craig McRae (1999)
 Jarrod Molloy (1999)
 Jason Akermanis (1999, 2000)
 Justin Leppitsch (1999, 2000)
 Luke Power (2000, 2003)
 Simon Black (2001)
 Nigel Lappin (2001)
 Chris Scott (2001)
 Darryl White (2001)
 Brad Scott (2002)
 Chris Johnson (2002, 2003, 2005)
 Mal Michael (2004)
 Justin Sherman (2006)
 Michael Voss (2006)
 Jared Brennan (2008)
 Todd Banfield (2010)
 Joel Patfull (2011)
 Ashley McGrath (2013)
 Tom Rockliff (2014, 2015)
 Dayne Zorko (2017)

Jim Stynes Medal
 Jason Akermanis (1999)
 Ashley McGrath (2013)

AFL Coaches Association awards

Champion Player of the Year Award

 Lachie Neale (2020)

Allan Jeans Senior Coach of the Year Award

 Chris Fagan (2019)

Coaching Legend Award

 Leigh Matthews (2013)

Career & Education Award

 Mitch Hahn (2017)

Australian Football Media Association Player of the Year

 Michael Voss (2001)

Herald Sun Player of the Year

 Simon Black (2001)
 Michael Voss (2003)

Lou Richards Medal

 Michael Voss (2001)

Australian Football Hall of Fame

Legends

 Leigh Matthews (inducted 1996)

Inductees

 Michael Voss (inducted 2011)
 Jason Akermanis (inducted 2015)
 Nigel Lappin (inducted 2016)
 Simon Black (inducted 2020)
 Jonathan Brown (inducted 2020)

AFL Queensland awards

Joe Grant Medal

 Ben Robbins (2001)
 Claye Beams (2012)
 Jack Crisp (2013)

Queensland Football Team of the Century (2003)

 Jason Akermanis
 Marcus Ashcroft
 Scott McIvor
 Mal Michael
 Michael Voss (captain)

Hall of Fame

Legends

 Leigh Matthews
 Michael Voss

Inductees

 Jason Akermanis
 Marcus Ashcroft
 Brisbane Lions 2001–03 (Leigh Matthews, Jason Akermanis, Marcus Ashcroft, Simon Black, Daniel Bradshaw, Jonathan Brown, Blake Caracella, Jamie Charman, Robert Copeland, Richard Hadley, Shaun Hart, Des Headland, Chris Johnson, Clark Keating, Nigel Lappin, Justin Leppitsch, Alastair Lynch, Beau McDonald, Ashley McGrath, Craig McRae, Mal Michael, Tim Notting, Martin Pike, Luke Power, Brad Scott, Chris Scott, Aaron Shattock, Michael Voss, Darryl White)
 Danny Dickfos
 Clark Keating
 Matthew Kennedy
 Steven Lawrence
 Scott McIvor
 Roger Merrett
 Mal Michael

NEAFL awards

Andrew Ireland Medal

 Sam Michael (2012)
 Jesse O'Brien (2013)
 Ben Keays (2017)
 Matt Eagles (2019)

Team of the Year

 Amon Buchanan (2011 – Northern Conference)
 James Hawksley (2012 – Northern Conference)
 Cheynee Stiller (2012 – Northern Conference)
 Stephen Wrigley (2012 – Northern Conference)
 Jack Crisp (2013 – Northern Conference)
 Patrick Karnezis (2013 – Northern Conference)
 Zac O'Brien (2014, 2015)
 Jonathan Freeman (2017)
 Oscar McInerney (2017)
 Liam Dawson (2018)
 Ryan Bastinac (2019)
 Matt Eagles (2019)
 Mitch Hahn (2019 – coach)
 Ben Keays (2019)
 Corey Lyons (2019)

VFL awards

Team of the Year
 Rhys Mathieson (2022)

Members of extended squads but not final teams
 Ryan Lester (2022)

Club awards

Best and fairest (Merrett–Murray Medal)

Awarded 1997–present.

 1997: Matthew Clarke
 1998: Chris Scott
 1999: Jason Akermanis/Justin Leppitsch
 2000: Michael Voss
 2001: Simon Black/Michael Voss
 2002: Simon Black
 2003: Michael Voss
 2004: Nigel Lappin
 2005: Jason Akermanis
 2006: Simon Black
 2007: Jonathan Brown
 2008: Jonathan Brown
 2009: Jonathan Brown
 2010: Michael Rischitelli
 2011: Tom Rockliff
 2012: Joel Patfull
 2013: Joel Patfull
 2014: Tom Rockliff
 2015: Dayne Beams/Stefan Martin/Mitch Robinson/Dayne Zorko
 2016: Dayne Zorko
 2017: Dayne Zorko
 2018: Dayne Zorko
 2019: Lachie Neale
 2020: Lachie Neale
 2021: Dayne Zorko

Merrett–Murray Medal runner-up

Awarded 1997–1998, 2000, 2002–2003, 2009–2014 and 2016–present, as "Runner-up Club Champion" from 1997–1998, in 2000 and from 2002–2003 and as "Nigel Lappin Trophy" from 2009–2014 and from 2016–present. An asterisk denotes that the award was not given that year, but the player placed second in the Merrett–Murray Medal vote count.

 1997: Nigel Lappin
 1998: Marcus Ashcroft
 2000: Nigel Lappin
 2002: Michael Voss
 2003: Simon Black/Luke Power
 2004: Luke Power*
 2005: Chris Johnson*
 2006: Justin Sherman*
 2007: Jed Adcock*
 2008: Simon Black*
 2009: Simon Black
 2010: Simon Black
 2011: Simon Black
 2012: Daniel Rich
 2013: Pearce Hanley
 2014: Dayne Zorko
 2016: Mitch Robinson
 2017: Dayne Beams
 2018: Dayne Beams
 2019: Dayne Zorko
 2020: Jarryd Lyons
 2021: Hugh McCluggage

Merrett–Murray Medal third place

Awarded 1997–2002, 2009–2014 and 2016–present, as "Third Place Club Champion" from 1997–2002 and as "Alastair Lynch Trophy" from 2009–2014 and 2016–present. An asterisk denotes that the award was not given that year, but the player placed third in the Merrett–Murray Medal vote count.

 1997: Marcus Ashcroft
 1998: Matthew Kennedy
 1999: Marcus Ashcroft
 2000: Justin Leppitsch
 2001: Nigel Lappin
 2002: Marcus Ashcroft/Brad Scott
 2004: Simon Black*
 2005: Jed Adcock*
 2006: Luke Power*
 2007: Tim Notting*
 2008: Luke Power*
 2009: Mitch Clark
 2010: Jonathan Brown
 2011: Jack Redden
 2012: Pearce Hanley
 2013: Jack Redden
 2014: Joel Patfull
 2016: Stefan Martin
 2017: Tom Rockliff
 2018: Stefan Martin
 2019: Hugh McCluggage
 2020: Hugh McCluggage
 2021: Jarryd Lyons

Team of the Decade
In June 2006, to recognise ten years since the creation of the Brisbane Lions, a Team of the Decade was announced.

Leading club goalkicker

Awarded 1997–present. Bold text denotes player won Coleman Medal by the being the AFL's leading goalkicker after the home-and-away season. Players in Italic text denotes player was the AFL's leading goalkicker after finals.
 1997: Justin Leppitsch (49 goals)
 1998: Justin Leppitsch (26)
 1999: Craig McRae (40)
 2000: Alastair Lynch (61)
 2001: Alastair Lynch (54)
 2002: Alastair Lynch (58)
 2003: Alastair Lynch (62)
 2004: Jason Akermanis (40)
 2005: Daniel Bradshaw (42)
 2006: Daniel Bradshaw (59)
 2007: Jonathan Brown (77)
 2008: Daniel Bradshaw (75)
 2009: Jonathan Brown (78)
 2010: Jonathan Brown (53)
 2011: Mitch Clark (27)
 2012: Jonathan Brown (47)
 2013: Jonathan Brown (28)
 2014: Josh Green (33)
 2015: Josh Green (25)
 2016: Dayne Zorko (23)
 2017: Dayne Zorko (34)
 2018: Eric Hipwood (37)
 2019: Charlie Cameron (57)
 2020: Charlie Cameron (31)
 2021: Charlie Cameron (55)

Clubman award
Awarded 1997–1998 and 2005, as 'Clubman of the Year' from 1997–1998 and as 'Best Clubman' in 2005.
 1997: Jarrod Molloy
 1998: Matthew Clarke
 2005: Jonathan Brown/Dylan McLaren

Rookie of the Year
Awarded 1997–present, as 'Best First Year Player' in 1997, 'Brian Powell Memorial Best First Year Player' in 1998, 'Brian Powell Memorial Rookie of the Year' from 1999–2001 and 'Rookie of the Year' from 2002–present.
 1997: Daniel Bradshaw
 1998: Simon Black
 1999: Simon Black
 2000: Beau McDonald
 2001: Robert Copeland
 2002: Jamie Charman
 2003: Ashley McGrath
 2004: Richard Hadley
 2005: Jed Adcock
 2006: Justin Sherman
 2007: Colm Begley
 2008: Bradd Dalziell
 2009: Daniel Rich
 2010: Tom Rockliff
 2011: Patrick Karnezis
 2012: Dayne Zorko
 2013: Sam Mayes
 2014: Lewis Taylor
 2015: Harris Andrews
 2016: Josh Schache
 2017: Eric Hipwood
 2018: Alex Witherden
 2019: Noah Answerth
 2020: Brandon Starcevich
 2021: Keidean Coleman

Most professional player
Awarded 1997–present, as 'Don Smith Most Professional Player' from 1997–2003, as 'Most Professional Player' from 2004–2008 and as 'Marcus Ashcroft Most Professional Player' from 2009–present.
 1997: Marcus Ashcroft
 1998: Matthew Kennedy
 1999: Chris Scott
 2000: Michael Voss
 2001: Jason Akermanis
 2002: Craig McRae
 2003: Michael Voss
 2004: Michael Voss
 2005: Jonathan Brown
 2006: Michael Voss
 2007: Robert Copeland
 2008: Daniel Bradshaw
 2009: Jonathan Brown
 2010: Daniel Merrett
 2011: Jed Adcock
 2012: Andrew Raines
 2013: Matthew Leuenberger
 2014: Michael Close
 2015: Ryan Lester
 2016: Tom Cutler
 2017: Harris Andrews
 2018: Harris Andrews
 2019: Harris Andrews
 2020: Harris Andrews
 2021: Oscar McInerney

Most improved player
Awarded 1999–2008.
 1999: Steven Lawrence
 2000: Luke Power
 2001: Jonathan Brown
 2002: Des Headland
 2003: Daniel Bradshaw
 2004: Robert Copeland
 2005: Jed Adcock
 2006: Michael Rischitelli
 2007: Daniel Merrett
 2008: Joel Patfull

Tackling award
Awarded 1997–2008, as 'Bill Cavanagh Memorial Player of the Year' from 1997–1998, as 'Bill Cavanagh Memorial Attitude Barometer Award' from 1999–2004 (in the categories of 'Full Ground' and 'Inside Forward 50m' from 1999–2000, in the categories of 'Most Effective Tackles' and 'Most Attempted Tackles' in 2001, in the categories of 'Most Effective Tackles' and 'Most Tackles' from 2002–2003, and in the categories of 'Most Effective Tackles', 'Most Tackles' and 'Most Difficult Tackles' in 2004), as 'Best Tackler' in 2005, as 'Most Effective Player' in 2006, and as 'Most Effective Tackler' from 2007–2008
 1997: Danny Dickfos
 1998: Steven Lawrence
 1999: Full Ground: Simon Black, Inside Forward 50m: Jarrod Molloy
 2000: Full Ground: Darryl White, Inside Forward 50m: Luke Power
 2001: Most Effective Tackles: Jason Akermanis, Most Attempted Tackles: Simon Black
 2002: Most Effective Tackles: Craig McRae, Most Tackles: Simon Black
 2003: Most Effective Tackles: Luke Power, Most Tackles: Simon Black
 2004: Most Effective Tackles: Nigel Lappin, Most Tackles: Nigel Lappin, Most Difficult Tackles: Robert Copeland
 2005: Jason Akermanis
 2006: Ben Fixter
 2007: Jed Adcock
 2008: Michael Rischitelli

Best Finals Player
Awarded 1999–2004, 2009 and 2019–present.
 1999: Jason Akermanis
 2000: Justin Leppitsch
 2001: Nigel Lappin
 2002: Michael Voss
 2003: Luke Power
 2004: Mal Michael
 2009: Luke Power
 2019: Stefan Martin
 2020: Hugh McCluggage/Lachie Neale
 2021: Charlie Cameron

Best Midfielder
Awarded 2006–2008.
 2006: Simon Black
 2007: Simon Black
 2008: Simon Black

Best Defender
Awarded 2006–2008.
 2006: Mal Michael
 2007: Daniel Merrett
 2008: Joel Patfull

Best Forward
Awarded 2006–2008.
 2006: Daniel Bradshaw
 2007: Jonathan Brown
 2008: Jonathan Brown

Most Competitive Player
Awarded 2006–present, as 'Most Courageous Player' from 2006–2008, as 'Shaun Hart Most Courageous Player' from 2009–2013, as 'Shaun Hart Most Competitive Player' from 2014–2016, and as 'Shaun Hart Trademark Player of the Year' from 2017–present.
 2006: Michael Voss
 2007: Jonathan Brown
 2008: Michael Rischitelli
 2009: Mitch Clark
 2010: Jonathan Brown
 2011: Jack Redden
 2012: Joel Patfull
 2013: Joel Patfull
 2014: Tom Rockliff
 2015: Mitch Robinson
 2016: Darcy Gardiner
 2017: Nick Robertson
 2018: Darcy Gardiner
 2019: Mitch Robinson
 2020: Oscar McInerney
 2021: Lincoln McCarthy

Members' Player of the Year
Awarded 2006–2018, as 'Members' Player of the Year' from 2006–2015 and as 'Hyundai Club Player of the Year' from 2016–2018.
 2006: Simon Black
 2007: Simon Black
 2008: Luke Power
 2010: Jonathan Brown
 2011: Simon Black
 2012: Jack Redden
 2013: Pearce Hanley
 2014: Tom Rockliff
 2015: Stefan Martin
 2016: Dayne Zorko
 2017: Dayne Zorko
 2018: Dayne Beams

Players' Player of the Year
Awarded 2009–present.
 2009: Simon Black
 2010: Simon Black
 2011: Simon Black
 2012: Jack Redden
 2013: Joel Patfull
 2014: Tom Rockliff
 2015: Mitch Robinson
 2016: Tom Rockliff
 2017: Tom Rockliff
 2018: Dayne Beams
 2019: Lachie Neale/Mitch Robinson/Dayne Zorko
 2020: Oscar McInerney
 2021: Dayne Zorko

The Courier-Mail Player of the Year
Awarded 2007–2010.
 2007: Jonathan Brown
 2008: Simon Black
 2009: Simon Black
 2010: Simon Black

Lions Club Player of the Year
Awarded 1998.
 1998: Derek Wirth

Reserves Player of the Year
Awarded 2014–2019 and 2021–present, as 'Reserves Player of the Year' in 2014 and as 'Neville Fallon Brisbane Lions Reserves Best & Fairest' from 2015–2019 and 2021–present.
 2014: Nick Hayes
 2015: Zac O'Brien
 2016: Billy Evans
 2017: Oscar McInerney
 2018: Ryan Bastinac/Claye Beams/Ben Keays/Corey Lyons
 2019: Ryan Bastinac
 2021: Connor Ballenden

Leading club votegetter in Brownlow Medal
Bold text denotes player won Brownlow Medal
 1997: Nigel Lappin (11 votes)
 1998: Michael Voss (7)
 1999: Jason Akermanis (13)
 2000: Michael Voss (16)
 2001: Jason Akermanis (23)
 2002: Simon Black (25)
 2003: Michael Voss (19)
 2004: Simon Black (18)
 2005: Luke Power (14)
 2006: Jonathan Brown (13)
 2007: Simon Black (22)
 2008: Simon Black (23)
 2009: Simon Black/Jonathan Brown (19)
 2010: Jonathan Brown (12)
 2011: Simon Black/Tom Rockliff (9)
 2012: Daniel Rich/Tom Rockliff (8)
 2013: Tom Rockliff (21)
 2014: Tom Rockliff (15)
 2015: Dayne Beams (9)
 2016: Tom Rockliff (9)
 2017: Dayne Beams (17)
 2018: Dayne Beams (18)
 2019: Lachie Neale (26)
 2020: Lachie Neale (31)
 2021: Jarryd Lyons (23)
 2022: Lachie Neale (28)

Hall of Fame

Legends

Inductees

Kings of the Pride

Club records

Most club matches

Most club goals

AFL Women's awards and records

External awards

AFL Women's best and fairest

 Emily Bates (2022)
 Ally Anderson (S7 [2022])

AFL Women's Grand Final best on ground

 Kate Lutkins (2021)
 Shannon Campbell (S7 [2022])

AFL Women's leading goalkicker

 Jesse Wardlaw (S7 [2022])

All-Australian team

 Emily Bates (2017, 2018, 2022)
 Sabrina Frederick-Traub (2017, 2018)
 Tayla Harris (2017)
 Kate McCarthy (2017)
 Sam Virgo (2017)
 Kate Lutkins (2018, 2020, 2021)
 Jess Wuetschner (2018)
 Ally Anderson (2019)
 Nat Grider (2022, S7 [2022])
 Orla O'Dwyer (2022)
 Greta Bodey (S7 [2022])
 Breanna Koenen (S7 [2022] — vice-captain)
 Jesse Wardlaw (S7 [2022])

Members of extended squads but not final teams

 Kaitlyn Ashmore (2017)
 Leah Kaslar (2017, 2018)
 Jess Wuetschner (2017, 2019)
 Emma Zielke (2017)
 Ally Anderson (2018, S7 [2022])
 Nat Exon (2019)
 Kate Lutkins (2019)
 Emily Bates (2020)
 Sophie Conway (2020, 2021)
 Jesse Wardlaw (2020)
 Dakota Davidson (2021)
 Cathy Svarc (2021)
 Greta Bodey (2022)
 Tahlia Hickie (S7 [2022])

AFLW Rising Star

Nominations

No Brisbane Lions players were nominated in season seven (2022).

Goal of the Year

 Courtney Hodder (2021)

AFL Players Association awards

Most Valuable Player award

 Emily Bates (2022)

22 Under 22 team

 Ally Anderson (2017–2019)
 Emily Bates (2017–2019)
 Shannon Campbell (2017–2019)
 Sophie Conway (2017–2019, 2020)
 Sabrina Frederick-Traub (2017–2019)
 Tayla Harris (2017–2019)
 Jesse Wardlaw (2020, 2022, S7 [2022])
 Dakota Davidson (2021)
 Nat Grider (2021, 2022, S7 [2022])
 Courtney Hodder (2021, S7 [2022])
 Tahlia Hickie (2022, S7 [2022])

Members of extended squads but not final teams

 Belle Dawes (2021, S7 [2022])
 Jade Ellenger (2022)
 Courtney Hodder (2022)

AFL Coaches Association awards

AFLW champion player of the year

 Emily Bates (2022)

AFLW Senior Coach of the Year Award

 Craig Starcevich (2021, S7 [2022])

Club awards

Best and fairest

Awarded 2017–present.
 2017: Emily Bates
 2018: Kate Lutkins
 2019: Ally Anderson
 2020: Emily Bates
 2021: Ally Anderson
 2022: Emily Bates
 S7 (2022): Emily Bates

Runner-up best and fairest

Awarded 2017–present.
 2017: Sabrina Frederick-Traub
 2018: Jamie Stanton
 2019: Nat Exon
 2020: Kate Lutkins
 2021: Orla O'Dwyer
 2022: Greta Bodey
 S7 (2022): Ally Anderson

Leading club goalkicker

Awarded 2017–present. Bold text denotes player won AFL Women's leading goalkicker by kicking the most goals in the league in the home and away season. Italic text denotes player was the AFL Women's leading goalkicker after finals.
 2017: Kate McCarthy (9 goals)
 2018: Jess Wuetschner (13 goals)
 2019: Jess Wuetschner (8 goals)
 2020: Jesse Wardlaw (9 goals)
 2021: Dakota Davidson (16 goals)
 2022: Greta Bodey (13 goals)
 S7 (2022): Jesse Wardlaw (22 goals)

Trademark Player of the Year

Awarded 2017–present, as "Player's Player of the Year" from 2017–2020 and as "Trademark Player of the Year" from 2021–present.
 2017: Emily Bates
 2018: Kate Lutkins
 2019: Nat Exon
 2020: Kate Lutkins
 2021: Breanna Koenen
 2022: Cathy Svarc
 S7 (2022): Breanna Koenen

Rising Star

Awarded 2019–present, as "Best First Year Player" (with the criterion that winners must be in their first year) from 2019–2022 and as "Rising Star" from season seven (2022)–present (with the criterion that winners must have played fewer than 25 AFLW games, regardless of how long they had been at the club).
 2019: Jesse Wardlaw
 2020: Cathy Svarc
 2021: Courtney Hodder
 2022: Lucinda Pullar
 S7 (2022): Ruby Svarc

Most Competitive

Awarded 2017–present.
 2017: Leah Kaslar
 2018: Nat Exon
 2019: Kate Lutkins
 2020: Nat Grider
 2021: Dakota Davidson
 2022: Belle Dawes
 S7 (2022): Courtney Hodder

Most Relentless

Awarded 2017–present, as "Most Courageous" in 2017 and as "Most Relentless" from 2018–present.
 2017: Kate Lutkins
 2018: Ally Anderson
 2019: Shannon Campbell
 2020: Sophie Conway
 2021: Cathy Svarc
 2022: Taylor Smith
 S7 (2022): Kate Lutkins

All For One Award

Awarded 2017–present.
 2017: Sam Virgo
 2018: Leah Kaslar
 2019: Sharni Webb
 2020: Sharni Webb
 2021: Shannon Campbell
 2022: Nat Grider
 S7 (2022): Jade Ellenger

Members' MVP

Fan-voted awards presented from 2017–2018 and from season seven (2022)–present, as "Members' MVP" from 2017–2018 and as "MVP for Best Lion Afield" from season seven (2022)–present.
 2017: Kate McCarthy
 2018: Kate Lutkins
 S7 (2022): Cathy Svarc

Best Finals Player

Awarded 2021–present.
 2021: Ally Anderson/Breanna Koenen
 2022: Emily Bates
 S7 (2022): Emily Bates

Leading club votegetter in AFL Women's best and fairest

Bold text denotes player won AFL Women's best and fairest.
 2017: Kaitlyn Ashmore (8 votes)
 2018: Sabrina Frederick-Traub (6)
 2019: Emma Zielke (4)
 2020: Kate Lutkins (5)
 2021: Ally Anderson (9)
 2022: Emily Bates (21)
 S7 (2022): Ally Anderson (21)

Club records

Updated to end of season seven (2022).

Most club games

Most club goals

See also

References

External links

Brisbane Lions
Lions
Brisbane Lions